Qarah Chay-e Naqshi (also Romanized as Qarah Chāy-e Naqshī; also known as Qarah Chāy-e Naqshīneh) is a village in Abbas-e Gharbi Rural District, Tekmeh Dash District, Bostanabad County, East Azerbaijan Province, Iran. At the 2006 census, its population was 88, in 21 families.

References 

Populated places in Bostanabad County